Direct part marking (DPM) is a process to permanently mark parts with product information including serial numbers, part numbers, date codes, and  barcodes. This is done to allow the tracking of parts through the full life cycle.

The interpretation of 'permanent' often depends on the context the part is used. In the aerospace industry an aircraft part may be in service for over 30 years. Within telecom and computer industries the life cycle may only last a few years.

DPM is often used by automotive, aerospace, and electronic manufacturers to facilitate a reliable identification of their parts. This can assist in data logging for safety, warranty issues and satisfy regulatory requirements. Also the United States Department of Defense demands a physical mark on tangible assets in conjunction with the Item Unique Identification.

Barcode types
There are many ways to encode an information to a machine-readable code. The preferred codes are the Data Matrix and the QR Code. Data Matrix is used by Motorola. It is also preferred by NASA to mark parts. In the automotive industries also the QR Code is used. This is founded in the fact that this code was initially developed by Denso Wave (a global automotive components manufacturer) for tracking parts in vehicle manufacturing.

Marking methods
Methods to produce a permanent mark on parts are:
 Indenting
 Embossing
 Coining
 Abrasive blasting
 Adhesive dispensing
 Cast, forge or mold
 Dot peen
 Scribe
 Electro-chemical etching
 Embroidery
 Engraving/milling
 Laser marking
 LaserShot peening
 Liquid metal jet
 Stencil (mechanical cut, photo process, laser cut)

Other methods like manual metal stamp, vibro-etch and embossing were not suitable to successfully apply micro size (1/32- to 15/64-inch square), high density machine-readable symbols.

Marking method selection factors
The marking method depends on a number of different factors:
 Part functionNon-intrusive marking methods are recommended for parts used in safety critical applications like aircraft engines or high pressure and high stress systems.
 Part geometryIt is more difficult to place a Data Matrix on a curved surface than it is on a flat surface.
 SurfaceHighly polished metal surfaces should be textured to reduce glare prior to marking. The textured area should extend one symbol width beyond the borders of marking.
 Part SizeWhen a 2D Symbol is used, the size of the part is not a relevant factor as the available marking area is reduced to below 1/4 inch square.
 Operating environment / age lifeIt should be controlled, if the used marking method can survive in its intended environment and remain readable for the life cycle of the part.
 Surface roughness / FinishA rough surface is more challenging for a 2D barcode as the data elements can be recognized appropriately. The surface roughness levels should be limited to 8 micro-inches for dot-peen marking, laser and scribe systems can make a readable mark in rougher surfaces. The laser systems burn a "quiet zone" first and then the 2D code. The scribe method provides a high resolution 2D mark that makes the part readily readable in most cast surfaces.
 Surface thicknessSurface thickness must be taken into account when applying intrusive markings to prevent deformation or excessive weakening of the part. In most applications the marking depth should not exceed 1/10 the thickness of the part.

Standards and regulations
 NASA-STD-6002D, Applying Data Matrix identification symbols on aerospace parts

Notes and references

Industrial processes